The Dade County Courthouse in Trenton, Georgia was built in 1926.  It was listed on the National Register of Historic Places in 1980.

It is a two-story brick and concrete building.  It was built by Barrett Construction Co. in what has been termed "Carpenter Style", also employed in the 1857 Dawson County Courthouse and the White County Courthouse.

References

Courthouses on the National Register of Historic Places in Georgia (U.S. state)
Government buildings completed in 1926
National Register of Historic Places in Dade County, Georgia
County courthouses in Georgia (U.S. state)